Maria Martinetti (1864–1921) was an Italian painter. She was a student of Gustavo Simoni. She lived and exhibited in Italy and France. In 1890 she moved to the United States. She is known for her genre paintings.

Biography
Martinetti was born in 1864. She attended the Academy of Fine Arts in Rome. She went on to exhibit her paintings in Rome, Venice and Paris. In 1890 she emigrated to the United States. Martinetti exhibited her work at the Palace of Fine Arts at the 1893 World's Columbian Exposition in Chicago, Illinois.

She died on August 16, 1921 in Marin County, California.

Gallery

References

External links

images of Maria Martinetti's work on Artnet

1864 births
1921 deaths
Orientalist painters
19th-century Italian women artists
20th-century Italian women artists